The Enchanted Day is a 1944 German romantic drama film directed by Peter Pewas and starring Winnie Markus, Hans Stüwe and Ernst Waldow. It explores the romantic ambitions of two women who work at a kiosk in a railway station.

The film was made at the Babelsberg Studios by Terra Film one of Germany's four dominant production companies. The film's sets were designed by Erich Grave.

The film's release was considerably delayed by Joseph Goebbels' Propaganda ministry after an initial screening in 1944 led to numerous objections. Attempts to improve it meant it was not released before the end of the Second World War. It finally premiered in Sweden in 1947 before going on general release in West Germany in 1951.

Cast
 Winnie Markus as Christine Schweiger
 Hans Stüwe as Professor Albrecht Götz
 Ernst Waldow as Rudolf Krummholz
 Eva Maria Meineke as Anni
 Hans Brausewetter as Wasner
 Carola Toelle as Frau Schweiger
 Karl Etlinger as Geschwander
 Curt Ackermann as Herr Maximilian
 Kate Kühl as Frau Pospischil
 Anneliese Würtz as Frau Hirblinger
 Karl Meixner as Kriminalbeamter
 Erich Fiedler as Dr. Steinacker
 Herbert Gernot as Augenarzt
 Karl Troxbömker as Diener
 Martha von Konssatzki as Blumenfrau

References

Bibliography

External links 
 

1944 films
1944 romantic drama films
Films of Nazi Germany
1940s German-language films
Films directed by Peter Pewas
Terra Film films
German romantic drama films
German black-and-white films
Films shot at Babelsberg Studios
1940s German films